Dasht-e Bezanjun (also Romanized as Dasht-e Bezanjūn; also known as Dash-e Bezenjan and Dasht-e Bezanjān) is a village in Rayen Rural District, Rayen District, Kerman County, Kerman Province, Iran. At the 2006 census, its population was 45, in 10 families.

References 

Populated places in Kerman County